A nurse is a healthcare professional.

Nurse or nurses may also refer to:

Occupations and activities
 Breastfeeding, also known as "nursing"
 Wet nurse, a woman who breastfeeds the baby of another
 Nursery nurse, a specialist in early childhood education
 Nurse, the old name for a nanny

Entertainment and literature
 Nurse (Romeo and Juliet), a character in William Shakespeare's Romeo and Juliet
 Nurse (album), an album by Therapy?
 Nurse (band), an American rock band
 Nurse (1979 book) by Peggy Anderson 
 Nurse (film), a 1969 Indian film
 Nurse 3D, a 2013 horror film (also released in a 2D version as Nurse)
 Nurse (American TV series), a 1981–1982 American drama series starring Michael Learned and Robert Reed
 Nurse (British TV series), a 2015 British sitcom by Paul Whitehouse
 Nurses (Australian TV series), a 2021 Australian factual television series
 Nurses (American TV series), an American early 1990s sitcom
 Nurses (Canadian TV series), a Canadian television drama series
 Nurse (Silent Hill), a monster from the video game series
 Nurses (band), an American rock band

Other uses
 Nurse tree, a tree that protects another plant when it is in its tender stages
 My American Nurse, film by Pascal Atuma
 Nurse (surname)

See also
 Nursing (disambiguation)
 The Nurse (disambiguation)